HMS Scourge was a Beagle-class destroyer, launched in 1910 and served in the Royal Navy. In 1913 she was transferred to the Third Destroyer Flotilla. She was used during the Gallipoli campaign to help transfer regiments to the shore at Anzac Cove and Suvla Bay.

Construction and result 
Scourge was built by the Hawthorn Leslie and Company, and launched on 11 February 1910. She was 84 metres long and 8.4 metres wide.

Gallipoli landings of WW1

At Suvla Bay on 6–7 August 1915, Scourge worked with five other Beagle destroyers as well as a Portuguese destroyer to tow troop landing craft to the shore.

Assistance with the HMHS Britannic

HMS Scourge assisted after the sinking of the hospital ship HMHS Britannic while cruising through the Mediterranean. She received SOS and CQD from the Kea Channel; steamed towards the location. Scourge picked up 339 survivors and the rest rowed to land on Kea Island, or got picked up by other ships afterwards.This Event happened during World War 1

Fate 
As with many ships of her time, Scourge was sold on 9 May 1921 and scrapped at Briton Ferry.

References

 

1910 ships
Ships built on the River Tyne
Beagle-class destroyers
World War I destroyers of the United Kingdom